{{DISPLAYTITLE:C3H3NS}}
The molecular formula C3H3NS (molar mass: 85.13 g/mol, exact mass: 84.9986 u) may refer to:

 Isothiazole, or 1,2-thiazole
 Thiazole, or 1,3-thiazole